The Emile Francis Trophy is presented annually to the American Hockey League (AHL) team that has the best record in the Atlantic Division.

The award is named after former AHL player Emile Francis, who later coached in the National Hockey League. Previously, it was awarded to winner of the North Division (2002–2003).

Winners

Winner by season
Key
‡ = Eventual Calder Cup champions

External links
Official AHL website
AHL Hall of Fame Trophies

American Hockey League trophies and awards